Eugène Paquet,  (23 October 1867 – 8 May 1951) was a Canadian parliamentarian.

Paquet was born in St-Agapit, Quebec, and prior to entering politics studied medicine and practised as a physician.  A Conservative, he was first elected to the House of Commons of Canada as Member of Parliament for the Quebec electoral district of L'Islet in the Canadian federal election of 1904, a seat he was to successfully defend in 1908 and 1911.  However, he was defeated in the elections of 1921 and 1926. In recognition of his service to the party, he was appointed to the Canadian Senate on 14 August 1935 on the recommendation of  Richard Bennett. He represented the senatorial division of Lauzon, Quebec until his death.

External links 
 

1867 births
1951 deaths
Physicians from Quebec
Canadian senators from Quebec
Conservative Party of Canada (1867–1942) MPs
Conservative Party of Canada (1867–1942) senators
Members of the House of Commons of Canada from Quebec
Members of the King's Privy Council for Canada
French Quebecers